The Good Design Award  is an award sponsored by the Japan Institute of Design Promotion, which is given to things with excellent design every year. It is the only comprehensive evaluation and recommendation system of design in Japan.

The Chicago Athenaeum also sponsors an annual Good Design Award which is unrelated to the Japanese award.

References

External links 

 
 

 
 
Design awards
Japanese awards